Skullbone  is an unincorporated community in Gibson County, Tennessee, United States.  It is located to the east of Bradford and is centered on Tennessee State Route 105. It was also known as North Gibson and Skin Bone.

History

The name was changed to Skullbone officially on April 26, 1898, when a United States Post Office opened there.  The post office at Skullbone remained operational until December 24, 1903.  The name has come into use as a reflection of local "bare-knuckle" fights held in the community, where strikes to the skull were common.

Skullbone has long been known in local circles as "The Capital of the Kingdom of Skullbonia."  The so-called "kingdom" is a vaguely defined area of northeastern Gibson County and, according to some, adjacent portions of neighboring counties. Hampton's Store, the only business currently operating in the community has elaborate murals painted on the side of the building depicting the Kingdom of Skullbonia's domain, bare-knuckle fighters, as well as declaring that there is a "Mayor's Office Upstairs," though it is unincorporated and has no elected council or mayor.

Another attraction that can be found in Skullbone is the famed signs which sit at the intersection of Skullbone Road and Tennessee State Route 105.  These signs give the mileage from Skullbone to many major cities throughout the world such as Calcutta, India (10,281 miles; 16545.7 km) and Jerusalem, Israel (6,869 miles; 1,1054.6 km) as well as local and regional communities and cities like Bradford (3 miles; 4.8 km), and Memphis (108 miles; 173.8 km).

References

Unincorporated communities in Gibson County, Tennessee
Unincorporated communities in Tennessee